Stade de Reims is a French professional football club based in Reims. The club was formed in 1910 and plays in Ligue 1, the top level of Football in France, having been promoted from Ligue 2 in 2018. Reims plays home matches at the Stade Auguste Delaune and are managed by William Still.

Reims is one of the most successful clubs in French football history having won six Ligue 1 titles, two Coupe de France trophies, and five Trophée des champions titles. The club has also performed well on European level having finished as runners-up in the 1956 and 1959 editions of the European Cup, and winning the Latin Cup and Coppa delle Alpi in 1953 and 1977, respectively. However, since the 1980s, Reims have struggled to get back to their zenith. The club hovered between Ligue 2 and the Championnat National for over thirty years after their relegation from the top flight in 1979. In 2012, they were promoted back to Ligue 1, were relegated again in 2016, but returned two years later.

Reims is viewed as a legendary club within French football circles, not only due to its domestic and European accolades, but its contribution towards the France national team through the 1940s and 1950s. They were largely responsible for the first Golden Generation of French football with Reims players Roger Marche, Raymond Kopa, Just Fontaine, Jean Vincent, Robert Jonquet, Armand Penverne, Dominique Colonna, and Roger Piantoni in the team that reached the semi-finals at the 1958 FIFA World Cup (third place).

History 
Stade de Reims was founded in 1910 under the name Société Sportive du Parc Pommery under the guidance of Marquis Melchior de Polignac, a Frenchman who later went on to serve on the International Olympic Committee. The club adopted its current name on 18 June 1931.

Despite the country adopting professional football in 1932, Reims remained an amateur club until 1935 after the club won the Championnat de France amateur under the leadership of Scotsman Billy Aitken. The club reached Division 1 for the first time in the 1945–46 season, the first championship following the conclusion of World War II. During the same year, the club promoted defender Robert Jonquet to the senior team and signed Roger Marche from Olympique de Charleville. Together, the two went on to become, arguably, the club's most famous players in its history.

Reims won its first Division 1 championship in 1949. Led by a talented backline of Marche, Jonquet, and Armand Penverne, as well as midfielders Albert Batteux and Michel Leblond, and an under-rated striker trio of Pierre Flamion, Pierre Sinibaldi, and Pierre Bini, Reims won the league by a single point over Lille. The following season, the club won the Coupe de France defeating Racing Paris 2–1 in the final.

After the season, manager Henri Roessler departed the club and longtime player Batteux took the reins. The team's subsequent rise in the sport led to the signings of Raymond Kopa and Raoul Giraudo. In 1953, Reims won its second league title winning the league by four points. That same year, the club won the Latin Cup becoming the first French football club to attained the honour. The victory was cited as a coup for France after the country finished three straight years as runners-up in the competition. After the 1954 season, Marche left to play for the Racing team in Paris. In 1955, Reims won its third title in six seasons. The championship led to the club's qualification for the newly created European Cup.

In the inaugural edition of the European Cup, Reims reached the final where the team was defeated 4–3 by Spanish club Real Madrid. Reims controlled the match from the outset scoring two goals in the first ten minutes. However, two first half goals by Alfredo Di Stéfano and Héctor Rial for Madrid cancelled out Reims' early attacks. In the second half, Reims took the lead through Michel Hidalgo, but within minutes, the match was levelled courtesy of a goal from Marquitos. Real's winner in the 79th minute ended Reims' hopes of winning the first edition of the European Cup. In the following season, Reims lost prominent midfielder Kopa to Madrid, but still were able to recruit French internationals Just Fontaine, Jean Vincent, Roger Piantoni, and Dominique Colonna to the team. After early struggles, the additions paid off with the club winning its third title of the decade in the 1957–58 season. The team also won the Coupe de France after beating Nîmes Olympique 3–1 in the final, thus achieving the double.

In the 1958–59 edition of the European Cup, Reims returned to the final to face, for the second time, Real Madrid. Aside from Kopa switching sides and the arrival of Fontaine, Colonna, Piantoni, and Vincent to Reims, the line-ups were nearly identical to the previous meeting. However, an undeterred Madrid, who had already won the competition three times, cruised through to a victory with a convincing 2–0 win. After the season, Penverne departed the club. The team was, however, boosted by the return of Kopa who, subsequently led the team to its fifth league title in 11 seasons in 1960.

Following the season, Jonquet retired from international football and left Reims for Strasbourg. He was followed by Giraudo and Leblond. The departures failed to hinder Reims' performances domestically as the team won the league in 1962. The championship capped an amazing career for Just Fontaine, who, subsequently, retired from football. In the ensuing season, which was longtime manager Albert Batteux's last, Reims finished runner-up to AS Monaco in the league and, the following season, shocked many by finishing 17th, which resulted in the club falling to the second division. The relegation led to the departures or retirements of many of the players who were a part of Reims' dynastic run in the 1950s; all except for Kopa who remained with Reims until 1967.

Reims returned to top-flight for the 1966–67 season after two seasons in the second division. However, the stint proved short with Reims finishing 19th. In 1970, the club returned to top-flight and remained in the league for nearly a decade. Reims' best performance in the league during its nine-year stint was finishing 5th in the 1975–76 season. Reims were relegated in 1979 and didn't return to the first division of French football for 33 years. In the ensuing season in Division 2, Reims was limited financially and was forced to field a much younger team during the campaign.

Despite the return of former popular player Carlos Bianchi as manager during the mid-1980s, the club failed to return to Division 1. Reims did surprise many by reaching the semi-finals of the Coupe de France in back-to-back seasons in 1987 and 1988. As the years wore on, the club's financial situation began to take a turn for the worse and, in 1991, Reims was administratively relegated to Division 3 after its failure to find a buyer to help alleviate the club's debt, which had exceeded over ₣50 million. In October 1991, the club underwent liquidation and changed its name to Stade de Reims Champagne FC. The club spent the 1991–92 season in Division 3 and were, surprisingly, declared ineligible to compete in the league ahead of its final league match in May 1992 after a judicial liquidation resulted in the stoppage of the club's activities. In the ensuing months, all aspects of the club (its records, trophies, etc.) were auctioned off. (Upon the club's re-introduction in 1992, a new French law restricting alcohol advertising banned their old logo, which included a bottle of wine on top of a football; the club had no formal logo until 1999, when the old club name was restored.)

Reims was reborn in July 1992 under the name Stade de Reims Champagne. The club began play in the Division d'Honneur and spent two seasons in the league before earning promotion to the Championnat National. Reims spent the final years of the century playing in National and the Championnat de France amateur. In November 1996, most of the club's items that were sold in the 1992 auction were re-acquired under the assistance of the Alain Afflelou retail chain. In July 1999, the club changed its name back to Stade de Reims and, after three years, were rewarded with professional status after earning promotion back to Ligue 2.

The club's return to Ligue 2 in 2002 was brief. Reims finished bottom of the league. In the next season playing in National, Reims won the league returning to Ligue 2. The club spent the next five seasons playing in the second division failing to finish in the top half of the table in every campaign. In the 2008–09 season, Reims were relegated from Ligue 2 and, like its previous relegation, responded by returning to the league after one season in National after finishing 2nd. Reims finished Ligue 2 as 10th in 2010–11 season. In the 2011–12 season, Reims finally finished the league as runner-up and returned to Ligue 1 after 33 years.

On 14 May 2016, Reims were relegated to Ligue 2 after a four year stay in the top flight. On 16 August 2016, Real Madrid played a friendly against Reims to commemorate the 60th anniversary of the 1956 European Cup final which both teams were involved in. Real Madrid won 5–3. On 21 April 2018, Reims were promoted back to Ligue 1 after a two year absence finishing first and claiming the Ligue 2 title.

In the 2018–19 season, Reims finished in 8th place, defeating champions Paris Saint-Germain 3–1 in the final game of the year. In the 2019–20 season, Reims were ranked in the 6th place, to qualify to the 2020–21 UEFA Europa League, and to play their first match in European competitions since 13 March 1963 against Feyenoord, which ended 1–1 in the 1962–63 European Cup. In the 2020–21 Ligue 1 season, Reims finished 14th on the table.

Honours

European record

Players

Current squad

Out on loan

Reserve team

Notable players
Below are the notable former players who have represented Stade de Reims in league and international competition since the club's foundation in 1910. To appear in the section below, a player must have played in at least 100 official matches for the club.

France
 Albert Batteux
 Armand Penverne
 Bruno Rodzik
 Cédric Fauré
 Dominique Colonna
 Jacques Favre
 Jean Templin
 Jean Vincent
 Just Fontaine
 Léon Glovacki
 Lucien Muller
 Marcel Aubour
 Michel Leblond
 Pierre Flamion
 Pierre Sinibaldi
 Raoul Giraudo
 Raymond Kopa
 René Bliard
 René-Jean Jacquet
 Robert Jonquet
 Robert Siatka
 Roger Marche
 Roger Piantoni
 Simon Zimny

Club officials
Management
President: Jean-Pierre Caillot
Association President: Didier Perrin

Coaching
Caretaker Manager: Will Still
Assistant manager: Ruben Martinez
Assistant manager: Vacant

Coaching history

References

External links

Soccerway Profile
ESPN Profile
UEFA Profile

 
Reims
1931 establishments in France
Sport in Reims
Reims
Ligue 1 clubs